Old Crown Brewing Corporation was an American brewery, founded as The French Brewery in 1862 by Charles L. Centlivre in Fort Wayne, Indiana.

History and products

 As of 1934, there was a minor league baseball team in Fort Wayne called The Centlivre Beers.
 There was a Centlivre Trolley that went past the brewery on its regular run.
 Once upon a time, you could call the brewery (Phone 62) and they would deliver beer to your home.
 The statue of CL Centlivre that stood atop the original brewery now stands above the entrance to Halls Gas House, a local eatery. It once blew down from the brewery during a wind storm in 1964.
 During the 1950s, Old Crown Ale was sold in multi-colored cans on several occasions. These red, gold, blue, yellow, green and purple cans are extremely rare today.
 During World War II, the 'Lazy Aged' man began appearing in Old Crown ads sleeping on a cloud, wearing a pointed hat, pointed shoes and festive clothes, sometimes with a spider web to put an exclamation point on his laziness. He would later appear on the side of Old Crown Beer and Bock cans, but not Ale, which would only have the words "Lazy Aged' on the label. Other characters included a pre-Prohibition character with a resemblance to the later lazy aged guy, the elf like Little Nick who symbolized Nickel Plate Beer. There was also 'Quartsie,' a talking 32 ounce bottle, and 'Crownie,' a character dressed like a waiter with crown-like eyebrows who appeared rather briefly on Old Crown beer cans, promotional items and advertisements in the early 1960s.
The term "Lazy Aged" was used to refer to the extensive aging of their products "To the peak of flavor perfection." In the case of Old Crown Bock, this was four months, from November to March when it would go on sale. 
 Alps Brau was touted on the radio as "Very Bavarian, Very Bavarian, Very Bavarian Beer" in radio jingles by a local musical act, Nancy Lee and The Hilltoppers.
 During the 19th and early to mid 20th centuries, several generations of both the Centlivre and Reuss families (They were related by marriage) ran the operation.
 The Centlivres were proficient in digging wells as exemplified by their charity work building the well for the St. Vincent's orphanage on Wells Street and their experience with drilling oil wells. 
 Another Fort Wayne brewery, Hoff-Brau, was a joint venture between the Centlivre and Berghoff operations. Early Hoff-Brau labels show both the Centlivre crown and the Berghoff eagle above the brand name. Hoff-Brau and Hoff-Brau Gold Star were produced at the Berghoff facility, and production of the brand ceased when the Berghoff brewery closed in the mid 1950s, eventually selling the physical plant to Falstaff, which operated it until the early 1990s.
 
 Old Crown produced Renner Golden Amber Beer, as well as Old German, Old Oxford and Kings Brew under the "Renner Brewing Co." name, for sale in Ohio.
 In 1950, the brewery underwent a million dollar renovation, with updated equipment, specialized equipment for distilling hop oil, a more efficient production process, new brewing technology (They called it "Smootherizing"), much expanded capacity,  and a large new production facility that dwarfed the original brewery, which was attached to it, forcing the city to cut a fairly sharp curve into Spy Run Avenue to accommodate the large new building. It was also around this time that the Old Crown label changed from the red, black and gold, gothic design they had been using since the 30s, to a simpler, more modern style: Red, white and gold for beer and green and silver for ale.  The new design lasted, with occasional minor changes, until the brewery closed in 1973.

The brewery's best-known brand was Old Crown, a renaming of their earlier Centlivre brand. Prior to Prohibition, brands included Nickel Plate Beer, Muechener, the aforementioned Centlivre Beer and The Centlivre Tonic, among others. Nickel Plate Beer is believed to be the only beer named after a railroad, the Nickel Plate Road and was served in its dining cars in the early twentieth century. During Prohibition they produced a near beer called That's It, and briefly revived the old Centlivre brand after Prohibition, before introducing Old Crown, which quickly became their flagship brand. The company itself adopted the Old Crown name when they merged with Chris-Craft Industries for a short time in 1962. Chris-Craft sold the company to its employees.  The brewery produced Old Crown Beer, Old Crown Ale, Old Crown Bock, Van Merrit, Old German, Renner and Alps Brau, until they ceased production on December 1, 1973. Peter Hand brewing of Chicago continued to make Old Crown beer and ale, as well as Van Merrit, Old German and Alps Brau, until the late 1980s.

Demolition
Plans to turn the old brewery into a historic site were dashed by vandalism during the 1970s. Hopes to utilize the remaining buildings were never realized, with the last of the brewery demolished in 1989. Only the Centlivre home and horse stables were saved.

Founder's biography
Charles Louis Centlivre was born in Dannemarie, Haut-Rhin, France, September 27, 1827. He was trained as a cooper (profession)  and initially came to America in 1847, having settled in New Orleans, Louisiana. After a cholera epidemic he returned to France, returning to America via New York City with his father and two brothers. After living in Massillon, Ohio and working as a cooper in Louisville, Ohio, he founded a brewery in McGregor, Iowa in 1850 and operated it until he came to Fort Wayne, Indiana in 1862 and founded the C. L. Centlivre Brewing Company with his brother, Frank. He died in 1894 at the age of 67.

References

External links
Brewing in Fort Wayne, Indiana from americanbreweriana.org

Beer brewing companies based in Indiana
1862 establishments in Indiana